Zophiuma is a genus of planthoppers in the tribe Acarnini, erected by Ronald Gordon Fennah in 1955.  Distribution records are limited to the New Guinea region.

Species
Fulgoromorpha Lists on the Web includes:
 Zophiuma butawengi (Heller, 1966)
 Zophiuma gitauae Soulier-Perkins & Le Cesne, 2021
 Zophiuma pupillata (Stål, 1863)  - type species
 Zophiuma torricelli Soulier-Perkins & Le Cesne, 2021

References

External Links

Auchenorrhyncha genera
Lophopidae
Hemiptera of Asia